Wuning County is a county in the northwest of Jiangxi Province, China, bordering Hubei Province to the north. It is under the administration of the prefecture-level city of Jiujiang.

Administrative divisions
Wuning County has one subdistrict, 8 towns and 11 townships.

1 subdistrict
 Yuning
8 towns

11 townships

Climate

References

External links

 
County-level divisions of Jiangxi
Jiujiang